

Erich Brandenberger (15 July 1892 – 21 June 1955) was a German general in the Wehrmacht of Nazi Germany during World War II. He was a recipient of the Knight's Cross of the Iron Cross with Oak Leaves.

Biography

In World War I Brandenberger served as an officer in the 6th Bavarian Field Artillery Regiment. He started World War II as Chief of the General Staff of the XXIII Army Corps (16 September 1939 - 15 February 1941) on the Westwall. He commanded 8th Panzer Division (20 February 1941 - 16 January 1943), LIX Army Corps (January — March 1943) and XXIX Army Corps (November 1943 - Jun 1944) on the Eastern Front. 

In late 1944 and early 1945, he led the 7th Army on the Western Front during the German Ardennes Offensive. He surrendered to the American forces commanded by Edward H. Brooks on 6 May 1945 as the commander of 19th Army in Innsbruck.

Awards
 Iron Cross (1914) 2nd Class (21 October 1914) & 1st Class (7 September 1916)
 Clasp to the Iron Cross 2nd Class (24 December 1939) & 1st Class (15 May 1940)
 Knight's Cross of the Iron Cross with Oak Leaves
 Knight's Cross on 15 July 1941 as Generalmajor and commander of the 8. Panzer-Division
 Oak Leaves on 12 November 1943 as General der Panzertruppe and commander of the XXIX. Armeekorps

References

Sources

 
 

1892 births
1955 deaths
Military personnel from Augsburg
People from the Kingdom of Bavaria
German Army personnel of World War I
Generals of Panzer Troops
Recipients of the clasp to the Iron Cross, 1st class
Recipients of the Knight's Cross of the Iron Cross with Oak Leaves
German prisoners of war in World War II held by the United States
Reichswehr personnel